John Alexander Tonelli (born March 23, 1957) is a Canadian former professional ice hockey forward from Milton, Ontario. He was a four-time Stanley Cup champion with the New York Islanders, and also played with the Calgary Flames, Los Angeles Kings, Chicago Blackhawks, and the Quebec Nordiques of the National Hockey League.

Early life
Tonelli was born at St. Joseph's Hospital in Hamilton, Ontario, on March 23, 1957, to his parents Alex Tonelli, Jr. and Joy Sclisizzi of Milton. He has an older brother Raymond, a younger brother David and a younger sister, Sandra. Tonelli's mother Joy Sclisizzi is a relative of Enio Sclisizzi, who was Milton's first NHLer.

As young man, Tonelli worked in Sclisizzi's bronze-plaque making factory where he washed the finished plaques.

Tonelli's father, who worked for 40 years in the steel business and set an example for his son for hard work, used to dam up the water in a culvert next to their home, which would freeze, and allowed Tonelli endless access to skating time near their home on Ontario St. in Milton.

Tonelli was a multi-sport athlete in his youth, serving as pitcher for the Red Sox in the Milton Minor Baseball Association in 1966, when he hit a grand slam in the same game he served as pitcher. In 1968, with his father as an assistant coach, Tonelli won an OBA championship for the Milton Mowbray Tykes. He had four one-hitters as a pitcher in the 1970 baseball season.

In 1971, he was Holy Rosary School's top basketball scorer with 42 points.

In 1972, as a 15-year-old, he pitched a perfect game as a bantam baseball player.

Tonelli began his hockey career in earnest when he played one year with the Milton Flyers of the Central Junior B Hockey League before joining the Marlies.

Career
Tonelli was the first 15-year-old player to be signed by the Toronto Marlies OHA team, and the first Miltonian to play with the Marlies since Murray "Cowboy" Grenke in the 1948–49 and 1949–50 seasons.

In his first season with them, Marlies' coach George Armstrong noted Tonelli was pro material.

Contract dispute between OHA and WHA
Tonelli was one of the first players to challenge the Ontario Hockey Association and the Marlies OHA team, with which he had signed a contract at age 16.  As he reached age 18, the WHA's Houston team offered him a contract worth $500,000 ($2.2 million CAD in 2016), but his contract with the Marlies tied him to the OHA team for three years plus an option.

In June 1975, the WHA owners voted to void Tonelli's Houston contract. Tonelli's agent threatened to sue, and the Marlies asked for $100,000 in compensation, plus 20 percent of Tonelli's three-year WHA contract.

Tonelli refused to play for Toronto in the playoffs after he turned 18, so that it would not imperil his legal arguments. Tonelli's agent Gus Badali sued the Marlies and the OHA, and eventually the Ontario courts ruled that the contract was unenforceable because Tonelli had been under the age of 18 when he signed it, and his parents had not signed it. Tonelli's teammate, future NHLer John Anderson, followed this same lead, sitting out for a period, but eventually returned to lead Toronto in the Memorial Cup.

Tonelli played for Houston for three seasons. During his time in Houston, he was drafted by the New York Islanders in the second round (33rd overall) in the 1977 NHL Amateur Draft after Jim Devellano, who was the Islanders Director of Scouting, came and visited Tonelli in Houston. Devellano was the only NHL scout to come and personally visit Tonelli in Houston while Tonelli was there, taking him out to dinner to talk.

Up until 1977, Tonelli often suffered once or twice a year from devastating migraine headaches that started age 10 and that doctors said were caused by his intensity and nervousness at game time.

Move to Islanders
Tonelli's NHL rights were reclaimed by NY Islanders after the Houston WHA franchise folded in July 1978.

In 1982 and 1985, Tonelli was a second team All-Star left wing for the Islanders. He played in the Stanley Cup finals in 1980, 1981, 1982, 1983, and 1984 with the Islanders, winning four championships in the process, and made an additional appearance as runner-up in the Cup finals in 1986 with the Flames.

On May 24, 1980, Tonelli had the assist on Bob Nystrom's overtime Stanley Cup-winning goal against the Philadelphia Flyers, giving the Islanders their first of four straight Cups. In Game 6 at Nassau Coliseum, Lorne Henning stole the puck at center ice, passed to Tonelli, who then criss-crossed with Nystrom, feeding him the puck on Nystrom's backhand for the winning goal at 7:11 of overtime. It was a play the two had perfected during practice. On January 6, 1981, Tonelli scored five goals in a game versus the Toronto Maple Leafs.

Tonelli was a gritty forward with a never-say-die attitude for the Islanders.  Tonelli, who was affectionately dubbed "The Greasy Jet" by his teammates, is remembered for scoring important "clutch goals" in the Islanders' run of four straight Stanley Cups and five straight finals appearances, particularly during the 1981-82 season. During the playoffs that year, The Islanders were five minutes away from being eliminated by a much weaker Pittsburgh Penguin team, trailing 3-1 in the deciding game. Tonelli assisted on a Mike McEwen goal that closed the champions within one goal, and tied the game himself with 2:21 to play. For an encore, it was John Tonelli that scored in overtime to win the game for the Islanders, thus extending their long reign as Stanley Cup champions.

Tonelli also scored the winning goal in a February 20, 1982 game against the Colorado Rockies, beating former teammate Chico Resch with just 47 seconds to play to allow the Islanders to set an NHL record (since broken) with their 15th consecutive victory.

Early in his Islander days, Tonelli was a curiosity to his teammates. He arrived early and stayed late. He made demands of himself that were so harsh that coaches felt compelled to ask Tonelli to save some of that work for the games.

He was known for being almost unbeatable in digging out the puck in the corners of the rink; however, Tonelli also had an excellent shot, was a good passer, and had excellent timing both offensively and defensively. Tonelli was also very versatile. During his eight seasons with the Islanders, coach Al Arbour used Tonelli on the famed "Banana Line" with Wayne Merrick and Bob Nystrom, on the top line with Bryan Trottier and Mike Bossy, and later he played flank for Brent Sutter and Patrick Flatley.

In his seventh season as a professional and his fourth with the Islanders, he scored 35 goals and 58 assists for 93 points, breaking Clark Gillies's club record for a left wing, 91, set in 1978-79.

Although Tonelli played a key role in the four Cup victories the team won from 1980 to 1983, in some ways his career culminated in the fall of 1984 when he played for Canada in the Canada Cup, an invitation he almost turned down.  He not only made the team, he had nine points, including a key assist on Mike Bossy's goal in overtime of the semifinal. Canada won the championship and Tonelli was named the tournament's best player, winning the 1984 Canada Cup MVP award.

He then rejoined the Islanders and had his best season ever, scoring 42 goals and 100 points in 1984-1985.

Flames and Kings years
During fall 1985, Tonelli was a holdout and missed 22 days of training camp and the early regular season in a bitter standoff with the Islanders. Tonelli was the first player under contract in Islanders history to hold out. At the time, the New York Times estimated he was making $200,000 per year on a four-year contract. After returning to the Islanders and playing out most of the season, he was traded to the Calgary Flames on March 11, 1986, for Richard Kromm and Steve Konroyd. The Flames, with Tonelli's experience, reached the Stanley Cup finals for the first time in 1986.

As a free agent, Tonelli was offered a termination contract by the Flames after they benched him during some playoff games in 1988, but he instead signed for the 1988–89 season with the Los Angeles Kings, where he was put on a line with Wayne Gretzky at times. Gretzky was traded to the Kings six weeks after the Kings acquired Tonelli.

A book called Hockey Scouting Report, 1988-89, authored by former NHL goalie John Davidson, who had played for the Islanders' rival the New York Rangers — which lost to the Islanders in the playoffs in 1981, 1982 and 1983 — and a couple of other writers, did a report on Tonelli that made his eyes water. "I don't want to point any fingers", Tonelli at the time. "Let's just say that the nature of the game is that some guys out there hold grudges a long time."

The book stated about Tonelli: "Once a good skater with a lot of power, Tonelli's skills are now on the downslide. He doesn't have the acceleration he once did, and for a straight-ahead player who had little agility, loss of speed and power is the worst loss that could be suffered. He retains a kind of laziness he's long had, in that he won't backcheck as well as he should, sort of coasting back to save his energy for another offensive rush."

However, Tonelli rewarded the Kings' faith in him by scoring back-to-back 31-goal seasons in 1988–89 and 1989–90.

During summer 1989, he entered a contract stand-off with Kings GM Rogie Vachon before a deal was reached during the pre-season. "You know, I went through a holdout with the Islanders in '86, and that was terrible. I was out for 23 days and it became a bitter thing. That's something that I didn't want to have happen here. I told you that I was looking at other teams this summer. My agent was, really. My heart was right here", said Tonelli.

Later years
In May 1991, the Kings left Tonelli unprotected in the NHL expansion draft. Then a free-agent, he said he sensed the Kings were not interested in his returning next season and instead signed with the Chicago Blackhawks.

On February 18, 1992, Tonelli was traded to the Quebec Nordiques by Chicago for future considerations. He finished the season there before retiring.

Tonelli finished his 1028-game NHL career with 325 goals and 511 assists for 836 points.

Personal life
The John Tonelli Arena in Milton, Ontario is named in his honour. He currently resides in Armonk, New York, working for Fidelity National Financial.

His older brother Ray was also a hockey and baseball player, and Tonelli's cousin is former NHLer Ryan Jones.

With his ex-wife Karen, John has two daughters and a son, Jennifer, Ashley, Ryan and with his current wife Lauren he has 2 sons, Jordan, 19, and Zach, 18. Tonelli coached his sons' hockey teams when they were younger.

Tonelli is the only player in history to score a regular-season goal on an assist by Gordie Howe and another regular-season goal on an assist by Wayne Gretzky.

Awards
 Stanley Cup champion - 1980, 1981, 1982, 1983
OMJHL First All-Star Team (1975)
Most valuable player of the 1984 Canada Cup tournament.
 Named to the NHL Second All-Star Team in 1982 and 1985
 Played in NHL All-Star Game (1982, 1985)
 Inducted into the inaugural class of the Milton Sports Hall of Fame in 2016
 Jersey #27 retired by the New York Islanders organization (2020)

Career statistics

Regular season and playoffs

International

See also
 Notable families in the NHL
 List of NHL players with 1,000 games played

References

External links
 
 Toronto Marlboro Major Junior "A" Hockey Club v Tonelli (1976), 11 OR (2d) 664 (HCJ)
 Toronto Marlboro Major Junior "A" Hockey Club v Tonelli (1977), 18 OR (2d) 21 (HCJ)
 Toronto Marlboro Major Junior "A" Hockey Club v Tonelli (1979), 23 OR (2d) 193, 96 DLR (3d) 135 (CA)

1957 births
Living people
Calgary Flames players
Canadian ice hockey centres
Canadian people of Italian descent
Chicago Blackhawks players
Houston Aeros (WHA) players
Ice hockey people from Ontario
Los Angeles Kings players
New York Islanders draft picks
New York Islanders players
Quebec Nordiques players
Sportspeople from Milton, Ontario
Stanley Cup champions
Toronto Marlboros players